The Mirchi Music Award for Upcoming Female Vocalist of The Year is given yearly by Radio Mirchi as a part of its annual Mirchi Music Awards for Hindi films, to recognise a female vocalist who has delivered an outstanding performance in a film song.

List of winners
 2008 Dominique Cerejo - "Ye Tumhari" from Rock On!!
 Suzanne D'Mello - "Aaye Bachchu" from Ghajini
 Anusha Mani - "Lazy Lamhe" from Thoda Pyaar Thoda Magic
 Shruti Pathak - "Mar Jawaan" from Fashion
 Anmol Malik - "Talli Ho Gayi" from Ugly Aur Pagli
 2009 Aditi Singh Sharma - "Yahi Meri Zindagi" from Dev.D
 K Bhavatharini - "Gumm Summ Gumm" from Paa
 Marianne D'Cruz Aiman - "Dua" from Kurbaan
 Pamela Jain - "Diwani Diwani" from Royal Utsav
 Mauli Dave - "Love Ka Tadka" from Love Ka Tadka
 2010 Mamta Sharma - "Munni Badnaam" from Dabangg
 Ritu Pathak & Alyssa Mendonsa - "Papa Jaag Jaayega" from Housefull
 Sukanya Purayastha - "Kaisi Hai Yeh Udaasi" from Karthik Calling Karthik
 Antara Mitra - "Bheegi Si Bhaagi Si" from Rajneeti
 Vibhavari Apte Joshi - "Saiba" from Guzaarish
 2011 Tia Bajpai - "Sheet Leher" from Lanka
 Alma Ferovic - "Aur Ho" from Rockstar
 Mitika Kanwar -"Habibi" from Azaan
 Shazneen Arethna - "I Hate You (Like I Love You)" from Delhi Belly
 Ujjaini Mukherjee - "Manu Bhaiya" from Tanu Weds Manu
 2012 Neeti Mohan - "Jiya Re" from Jab Tak Hai Jaan
 Shalmali Kholgade & Monali Thakur - "Aga Bai" from Aiyyaa
 Shalmali Kholgade - "Pareshaan" from Ishaqzaade
 Suman Sridhar - "Muskaanein Jhoothi Hai"	Taalash
 Priya Panchal - "Piya O Re Piya (Sad)" from Tere Naal Love Ho Gaya
 2013 Bhoomi Trivedi - "Ram Chahe Leela" from Ram-Leela
 Palak Muchhal - "Chahun Main Yaa Na" from Aashiqui 2
 Palak Muchhal - "Meri Aashiqui" from Aashiqui 2
 Mili Nair - "Meethi Boliyaan" from Kai Po Che!
 2014 Nooran Sisters - "Patakha Guddi" from Highway
 Kanika Kapoor - "Baby Doll" from Ragini MMS 2
 Jasmine Sandlas - "Yaar Naa Miley" from Kick
 Shraddha Kapoor - "Do Jahaan" from Haider
 Shraddha Kapoor - "Galliyan (Unplugged)" from Ek Villain
 2015 Payal Dev - "Ab Tohe Jane Na Doongi" from Bajirao Mastani
 Swati Sharma - "Banno" from Tanu Weds Manu Returns
 Sukriti Kakar - "Pehli Baar" from Dil Dhadakne Do
 Vaishali Made - "Pinga" from Bajirao Mastani
 Shraddha Kapoor - "Bezubaan Phir Se (Unplugged)" from ABCD 2
 2016 Asees Kaur - "Bolna" from Kapoor & Sons
 Aakanksha Sharma - "Tu Alvida" from Traffic
 Aakanksha Sharma - "Dhal Jaun Main" from Rustom
 Asees Kaur - "Rang Reza" from Beiimaan Love
 Qurat-ul-Ain Balouch - "Kaari Kaari" from Pink
 2017 Meghna Mishra - "Main Kaun Hoon" from Secret Superstar
 Rajnigandha Shekhawat - "Kankad" from Shubh Mangal Saavdhan
 Mehak Ali - "Baab-E-Rehmat" from Sheitaan
 Meghna Mishra - "Meri Pyaari Ammi" from Secret Superstar
 Meghna Mishra - "Nachdi Phira" from Secret Superstar
 Parineeti Chopra - "Maana Ke Hum Yaar Nahin" from Meri Pyaari Bindu
 Anushka Shahaney - "Stay a Little Longer" from Half Girlfriend
 2018 Mahua Chokroborty - "Ab Maan Jao Sawaryia" from Angrezi Mein Kehte Hain
 Harjot Kaur - "Sajan Bade Senti" from Badhaai Ho
 Dhvani Bhanushali - "Dilbar" from Satyameva Jayate
Deveshi Sahgal - "Daryaa (Unplugged)" from Manmarziyaan
Jasmin Walia - "Bom Diggy" from Sonu Ke Titu Ki Sweety
 2019

See also
 Mirchi Music Awards
 Bollywood
 Cinema of India

References

Mirchi Music Awards